

Alnothus was a medieval Bishop of Dorchester, when the town was seat of the united dioceses of Lindsey and Dorchester.

Alnothus was consecrated between 971 and 975 and died between 975 and 979.

Notes

Citations

References

External links
 

Bishops of Dorchester (Mercia)
970s deaths
Year of birth unknown
Year of death uncertain